Rejoneador (pl. rejoneadores; "lancer") is the name given to a bullfighter who fights the bull on horseback. The rejoneo is a form of bullfighting in Portugal and in Spanish bullfighting.

Popular culture
Mounted bullfighting is featured as a central theme in John Derek's 1984 romantic drama Bolero. The lead character, played by Bo Derek, and the male protagonist, played by Andrea Occhipinti, are rejoneadores; the actors were body-doubled by rejoneador brothers Ángel and Rafael Peralta.

References

Bullfighters